Roy Kline may refer to:
 Roy Kline (footballer), Australian rules footballer
 Roy L. Kline, United States Marine Corps general

See also
 Roi Klein, Israeli major